The 1989 Hockey East Men's Ice Hockey Tournament was the 5th Tournament in the history of the conference. It was played between March 3 and March 11, 1989. Quarterfinal games were played at home team campus sites, while the final four games were played at the newly opened Conte Forum in Chestnut Hill, Massachusetts, the home venue of the Boston College Eagles. This was the final year the Hockey East championship was decided at a home venue to one of its member teams (as of 2014). By winning the tournament, Maine received the Hockey East's automatic bid to the 1989 NCAA Division I Men's Ice Hockey Tournament.

Format
The tournament featured three rounds of play with each matchup being a single-elimination game. The team that finishes in seventh place is ineligible for tournament play. In the first round, the third seed and sixth seeds, and the fourth seed and fifth seeds played with the winner advancing to the semifinals. In the semifinals, the first seed and lowest remaining quarterfinalist and second seed and highest remaining quarterfinalist each play a game with the winners advancing to the championship game and the losers meeting in a consolation match. The tournament champion receives an automatic bid to the 1989 NCAA Division I Men's Ice Hockey Tournament.

Conference standings
Note: GP = Games played; W = Wins; L = Losses; T = Ties; PTS = Points; GF = Goals For; GA = Goals Against

Bracket

Teams are reseeded after the quarterfinals

Note: * denotes overtime period(s)

Quarterfinals

(3) Northeastern vs. (6) New Hampshire

(4) Providence vs. (5) Boston University

Semifinals

(1) Boston College vs. (4) Providence

(2) Maine vs. (3) Northeastern

Consolation

(3) Northeastern vs. (4) Providence

Championship

(1) Boston College vs. (2) Maine

Tournament awards

All-Tournament Team
F Steve Heinze (Boston College)
F Guy Perron (Maine)
F Tim Sweeney (Boston College)
D Bob Beers* (Maine)
D Greg Brown (Boston College)
G Matt DelGuidice (Maine)
* Tournament MVP(s)

References

External links
Hockey East Online

Hockey East Men's Ice Hockey Tournament
HE tournament